The Sydbank Esbjerg Challenge was a golf tournament on the Challenge Tour held at Esbjerg Golf Club, Esbjerg, Denmark.

The inaugural tournament in 2021 was the second of the Challenge Tour's Danish Swing in August, following the Made in Esbjerg Challenge, both co-sanctioned by the Nordic Golf League. 

Norway's Espen Kofstad shot a final round of 67 to join Ewen Ferguson on −11 after the Scot shot a final round 69. Kofstad won the sudden death playoff as he birdied the first extra hole to claim his first win in five years.

Winners

Notes

References

External links
Coverage on the Challenge Tour's official site

Former Challenge Tour events
Golf tournaments in Denmark